Gustave Augustin Rouxel (February 2, 1840 – March 16, 1908) was a French-born bishop of the Catholic Church. He served as auxiliary bishop of the Archdiocese of New Orleans from 1899 to 1908.

Biography
Born in Redon, Ille-et-Vilaine, France, Gustave Rouxel was ordained a priest for the Archdiocese of New Orleans on November 4, 1863.  On February 10, 1899 Pope Leo XIII appointed him as the Titular Bishop of Curium and Auxiliary Bishop of New Orleans.  He was consecrated a bishop by Archbishop Placide Chapelle on April 9, 1899. The principal co-consecrators were Bishops Thomas Heslin of Natchez and Jose Maria Ignacio Montes de Oca y Obregón of San Luis Potosí (Mexico).  He continued to serve as an auxiliary bishop until his death on March 16, 1908, at the age of 68.  He is buried in the Cathedral-Basilica of Saint Louis King of France in New Orleans.

References

Episcopal succession

1840 births
1908 deaths
People from Redon, Ille-et-Vilaine
French emigrants to the United States
Roman Catholic Archdiocese of New Orleans
20th-century American Roman Catholic titular bishops
French Roman Catholic bishops in North America
Roman Catholic bishops in Louisiana
19th-century Roman Catholic bishops in the United States